Ngāti Tama is a historic Māori iwi of present-day New Zealand which whakapapas back to Tama Ariki, the chief navigator on the Tokomaru waka. The iwi of Ngati Tama is located in north Taranaki around Poutama. The Mōhakatino river marks their northern boundary with the Tainui and Ngāti Maniapoto iwi. Titoki marks the southern boundary with Ngati Mutunga. The close geographical proximity of Tainui's Ngati Toa of Kawhia and Ngati Mutunga explains the long, continuous, and close relationship among the three Iwi.

History and territory
Ngati Tama people migrated south in the 1820s in search of better opportunities (e.g., trade), to ensure their safety (e.g., there was the ongoing threat from musket-carrying Tainui war parties), and close whakapapa and historic ties with Ngati Toa (the main migrant group heading south to Te Whanganui-a-Tara – now Wellington). Ngati Tama's paramount chief Te Pūoho-o-te-rangi was in charge of leading the expedition south, along with his brother Te Kaeaea and other chiefs.

While Ngati Tama was one of the first Taranaki iwi to arrive in Wellington in the 1820s, other Iwi, hapu and whanau joined the migration from Taranaki e.g., Ngati Mutunga, and Te Atiawa. People from these three Iwi have in common the same heritage back to the Tokomaru waka. The central and southern Taranaki tribes, including Wanganui also participated in the journey south.

The evidence suggests that Ngati Tama arrived in Whanganui-a-Tara in a series of migrations from Taranaki (along with Te Atiawa, and led by Ngati Toa) in 1822, participating in a process of invasion and conquest and occupation of the environs of Wellington by 1824. They encountered the Iwi who were already settled in Te Whanganui-a-Tara, including Ngai Tara, Ngati Ira, and Ngati Kahungunu.

While Ngati Toa, and the Taranaki iwi, hapu, whanau had shared intersecting rights throughout the environs of Wellington, Ngati Tama maintained a separate and distinct identity in various places in Wellington. Ngati Tama places of residence on the harbour included Kaiwharawhara, Pakuao and Raurimu from the first arrival in 1824, Tiakiwai (Thorndon) after the departure of Ngati Mutunga (in 1835).

Ngati Tama settlements were established at Ohariu, Mākara, Ohaua and Oterongo on the western coast; and Komangarautawhiri further north. Ngati Tama also had summer fishing kainga at Okiwi and Mukamuka (Palliser Bay).

The rights and customary interests of Ngati Tama included all interests and all rights in Te Whanganui-a-Tara and the lands and resources of those places, in particular westward to the coast. Ngati Tama were joint tangata whenua, and had tino rangatiratanga, mana whenua and tangata whenua status over those lands in accordance with traditional Maori law and custom. They exerted such status by their mana, rangatiratanga, by creating relations between groups, or by physical use, cultivation and occupation.

Ngati Tama maintained a separate and distinct identity in Wellington and enjoyed occupation, fishing, birding, and cultivation rights there. Ngati Tama also set up a functioning organisational structure, including hapu and whanau units, with associated kainga, marae, waahi tapu, etc.

Moriori genocide

Despite the pressures of competing interests among the iwi of Wellington, initially, a thriving economy developed that was largely based on servicing visiting ships in particular. However, some people had lost their lives in the journey south (e.g., Te Taku). In November 1835 after a series of beach front hui which discussed the possible invasion of Samoa and Norfolk Island, many took part in the invasion by sea of the Chatham Islands which were closer. Together with Ngati Mutunga, they captured the mate of The Lord Rodney and threatened to kill him unless they were taken to the Chatham Islands. After they reached the islands, the tribes took part in a slaughter of about 300 Moriori, raping many women, enslaving the survivors, and destroying the Moriori economy and way of life. Some returned home to Taranaki.

In 1835, 24 generations after the Moriori chief Nunuku had forbidden war, Moriori welcomed about 900 people from two Māori tribes, Ngāti Mutunga and Ngāti Tama. Originally from Taranaki on New Zealand’s North Island, they had voyaged from Wellington on an overcrowded European vessel, the Rodney. They arrived severely weakened, but were nursed back to health by their Moriori hosts. However, they soon revealed hostile intentions and embarked on a reign of terror.

Stunned, the Moriori called a council of 1,000 men at Te Awapātiki to debate their response. The younger men were keen to repel the invaders and argued that although they had not fought for many centuries, they outnumbered the newcomers two to one and were a strong people. But the elders argued that Nunuku’s Law was a sacred covenant with their gods and could not be broken. The consequences for Moriori were devastating.

Although the total number of Moriori first slaughtered was said to be around 300, hundreds more were enslaved by the invading tribes and later died. Some were killed by their captors. Others, horrified by the desecration of their beliefs, died of kongenge or despair. According to records made by elders, 1,561 Moriori died between 1835 and 1863, when they were released from slavery. Many succumbed to diseases introduced by Europeans, but large numbers died at the hands of Ngāti Mutunga and Ngāti Tama. In 1862 only 101 remained. When the last known full-blooded Moriori died in 1933, many thought this marked the extinction of a race.

European colonisation and displacement
In the late 1830s, the New Zealand Company brought into Te Whanganui-a-Tara boatloads of European colonisers in search of a place to settle. The effects on the Ngati Tama of the European settlers, who competed for resources, was to prove disastrous as the new arrivals sought Maori land.

The Port Nicholson Deed was a land sale transaction between the New Zealand Company and chiefs in the Hutt Valley, with the Ngati Tama Chief Te Kaeaea participating. The New Zealand Company thought they had purchased land from Te Kaeaea, but they had only been given anchorage and port rights to Wellington harbour.

The Crown set up the Spain Commission to enquire into the Wellington land sales. Spain came to adopt an attitude towards Ngati Tama claims, which ultimately came to seriously prejudice their interests because of Ngati Tama's actions in occupying land in the Hutt. While Spain noted the numerous faults inherent in the land sales, his findings incorrectly assumed that Te Kaeaea's participation in the Port Nicholson transaction was equal to complete comprehension of, and support for, the sale of Ngati Tama land. Despite the protestations from Ngati Tama people, the Crown assisted the settlers by making grants of Ngati Tama lands. The impact of Crown action in Whanganui-a-Tara was fatal; Ngati Tama lost the land they had conquered in 1822.

In 1844 Governor Fitzroy adopted a policy of compensating Ngati Tama. There was no consultation, and compensation proceeded in a summary fashion. Ngati Tama living in Kaiwharawhara received their share of the compensation under protest, and Ngati Tama living in Ohariu missed out on any payment at all.

In 1847, McCleverty concluded a series of agreements with Ngati Tama to finally settle the reserves issue. In total the 200 Ngati Tama received 2600 acres of reserves. These  reserves (about 13 acres per person) were set aside as compensation. Whatever reserves had been awarded was inadequate for their needs. The reserves were also unsuitable for cultivation, and crops had been integral to their survival.

By 1842, the Ngati Tama people were forcibly removed from their lands by Crown-assisted settler occupation. They sought refuge by squatting on land in the Hutt Valley where the land was more productive than the reserve land they had been awarded. But this was short-lived; the Hutt occupation ended in February 1846, when Governor Grey evicted Ngati Tama under the threat of military intervention. Ngati Tama's cultivated areas, their sole means of survival, were plundered. The Ngati Tama chief, Te Kaeaea was exiled in Auckland. The remaining Ngati Tama people had to seek sanctuary with other Iwi and hapu in Wellington or elsewhere, suffered high levels of sickness and mortality, and had to sell reserve land out of necessity. When the Crown had finished its land acquisition programme, Ngati Tama had virtually no land left. By the 1870s Ngati Tama had largely moved from the harbour rim and had been evicted.

The impact on Ngati Tama was significant. Ngati Tama people had been scattered by the invasion of the Waikato tribes during the musket wars of the 1820s. Many then left Wellington which they had invaded and conquered, to take part in the seaborne invasion of the Chatham Islands. Some individuals survived, many in whanau groupings, living with other Iwi and hapu. But there was an absence of a contemporary, organised formal Ngati Tama Iwi presence in Wellington. Ngati Tama's land base and visible identity in Wellington as local Iwi was lost.

In the absence of an organised entity representing Ngati Tama in Wellington, other Iwi such as Ngati Toa and Te Atiawa took responsibility for looking after Ngati Tama interests. In particular, the Wellington Tenths Trust has directly represented the interests of its beneficiaries, namely those individuals and their descendants who were named as owners in Ngati Tama reserves in the Wellington region in the 19th century.

Ngati Tama Claims Settlement Act 2003

In 2003, the iwi's historical Treaty of Waitangi claims were resolved with the passing of the Ngati Tama Claims Settlement Act 2003. The Act includes a historical narrative of the Crown's interactions with iwi and the apology:
 The Crown profoundly regrets and unreservedly apologises to Ngati Tama for its actions, which have resulted in the virtual landlessness of Ngati Tama in Taranaki, and which have caused suffering and hardship to Ngati Tama over the generations to the present day.[...]

Also on the settlement were specific financial benefits.

Radio station
Te Korimako O Taranaki is the radio station of Ngati Tama and other Taranaki region iwi, including Ngati Mutunga, Te Atiawa, Ngāti Maru, Taranaki, Ngāruahine, Ngati Ruanui and Ngaa Rauru Kiitahi. It started at the Bell Block campus of Taranaki Polytechnic in 1992, and moved to the Spotswood campus in 1993.

Notable people

 Airini Nga Roimata Grennell
 Huria Matenga
 Te Kiore Paremata Te Wahapiro
 William Barnard Rhodes-Moorhouse
 William Henry Rhodes-Moorhouse
 Te Kaeaea
 Te Pūoho-o-te-rangi
 Waitaoro

See also
List of Māori iwi
Moriori

References

External links
 Ngāti Tama website

 
Wellington
Chatham Islands